Conus miamiensis is an extinct species of sea snail, a marine gastropod mollusk in the family Conidae, the cone snails, cone shells or cones. The species was exclusive to southern Florida.  

This species is the type taxon of the fossil genus † Tequestaconus Petuch & Drolshagen, 2015

Description
The shell attains a length of 32 mm.

Distribution
This fossil species is known from the Plio-Pleistocene of Florida.

References

 E.J. Petuch (1986), The Pliocene Reefs of Miami: Their Geomorphological Significance in the Evolution of the Atlantic Coastal Ridge, Southeastern Florida, U.S.A.; Journal of Coastal Research Vol. 2, No. 4 (Autumn, 1986), pp. 391-408
 Hendricks JR. The Genus Conus (Mollusca: Neogastropoda) in the Plio-Pleistocene of the Southeastern United States. Bull Am Paleontol. 2009;375: 1–180

External links
 World Register of Marine Species
 The Neogene Atlas of Ancient Life in the Southeastern United States

miamiensis